Wilfred Lytell (16 October 1891 – 10 September 1954) was an American film actor.

Biography
Lytell was born in New York City, New York and appeared in 35 films between 1915 until 1952. He died in Salem, New York, on September 10, 1954. His brother, actor Bert Lytell, died on September 28, just 18 days after his brother's death.

Partial filmography

 The Conflict (1916)
Freddy's Narrow Escape (1916)
The Combat (1916) (uncredited)
Our Mrs. McChesney (1918)
 Thunderbolts of Fate (1919)
The Fatal Hour (1920)
Heliotrope (1920)
The Harvest Moon (1920)
Know Your Men (1921)
The Man Who Paid (1922)
 The Fair Cheat (1923)
 The Leavenworth Case (1923)
The Warrens of Virginia (1924)
The Trail of the Law (1924)
Bluebeard's Seven Wives (1926)

References

External links

 
 
 Wilfred Lytell photos (New York City Public Library, Billy Rose collection)
 Still from Our Mrs. McChesney with Lucille Lee Stewart, Wilfred Lytell, Ethel Barrymore (University of Washington Sayre)

1891 births
1954 deaths
American actors